A slow cooker, also known as a crock-pot (after a trademark owned by Sunbeam Products but sometimes used generically in the English-speaking world), is a countertop electrical cooking appliance used to simmer at a lower temperature than other cooking methods, such as baking, boiling, and frying. This facilitates unattended cooking for many hours of dishes that would otherwise be boiled: pot roast, soups, stews and other dishes (including beverages, desserts and dips).

History
Slow cookers achieved popularity in the US during the 1940s, when many women began to work outside the home. They could start dinner cooking in the morning before going to work and finish preparing the meal in the evening when they came home.

The Naxon Utilities Corporation of Chicago, under the leadership of electrical engineer Irving Naxon (born Irving Nachumsohn), developed the Naxon Beanery All-Purpose Cooker for the purposes of cooking a bean meal. Naxon was inspired by a story from his mother which told how back in her native Lithuanian town, his grandmother made a traditional Jewish stew called cholent which took several hours to cook in an oven. A 1950 advertisement shows a slow cooker called the "Simmer Crock" made by the Industrial Radiant Heat Corp. of Gladstone, NJ.

The Rival Company from Sedalia, Missouri, bought Naxon in 1970, acquiring Naxon’s 1940 patent for the bean simmer cooker. Rival asked inventor Robert Glen Martin, from Boonville, Missouri, to develop Naxon’s bean cooker into a large scale production model which could cook an entire family meal, going further than just cooking a bean meal. Martin also designed and produced the mass-production machines for Rival’s manufacturing line of the Crock-Pot. The cooker was then reintroduced under the name "Crock-Pot" in 1971. In 1974, Rival introduced removable stoneware inserts, making the appliance easier to clean. The Crock-Pot brand now belongs to Newell Brands.

Other brands of this appliance include Cuisinart, GE, Hamilton Beach, KitchenAid, Magic Chef, West Bend Housewares, and the now defunct American Electric Corporation.

Design

A basic slow cooker consists of a lidded round or oval cooking pot made of glazed ceramic or porcelain, surrounded by a housing, usually metal, containing an electric heating element. The lid itself is often made of glass, and seated in a groove in the pot edge; condensed vapor collects in the groove and provides a low-pressure seal to the atmosphere. The contents of a crock pot are effectively at atmospheric pressure, despite the water vapor generated inside the pot. A slow cooker is quite different from a pressure cooker and presents no danger of an abrupt pressure release.

The "crock", or ceramic pot, itself acts as both a cooking container and a heat reservoir. Because the heating elements are generally located at the bottom and often also partway up the sides, most slow cookers have a minimum recommended liquid level to avoid uncontrolled heating. Some newer models have coated aluminum or steel "crocks" which, while not as efficient as ceramic at retaining heat, does allow for quicker heating and cooling as well as the ability to use the "crock" on the stove top to brown meat prior to cooking.

Many slow cookers have two or more heat settings (e.g., low, medium, high, and sometimes a "keep warm" setting); some have continuously variable power. In the past, most slow cookers had no temperature control and deliver a constant heat to the contents. The temperature of the contents rises until it reaches boiling point, at which point the energy goes into gently boiling the liquid closest to the hot surface. At a lower setting, it may just simmer at a temperature below the boiling point. While many basic slow cookers still operate in this manner, newer models have computerized controls for precise temperature control, delayed cooking starts and even control via a computer or mobile device.

Operation
To use a slow cooker, the cook places raw food and a liquid, such as stock, water, or wine, in the slow cooker. Some recipes call for pre-heated liquid. The cook puts the lid on the slow cooker and turns it on. Some cookers automatically switch from cooking to warming (maintaining the temperature at ) after a fixed time or after the internal temperature of the food, as determined by a probe, reaches a specified value.

Heating element heats the contents to a steady temperature in the  range. The contents are enclosed by the crock and the lid, and attain an essentially constant temperature. The vapor that is produced at this temperature condenses on the bottom of the lid and returns as liquid, into which some water-soluble vitamins are leached.

The liquid transfers heat from the pot walls to its contents, and also distributes flavors. The slow cooker's lid is essential to prevent the warm vapor from escaping, taking heat with it and cooling the contents.

Basic cookers, which have only high, medium, low, or keep warm settings, must be turned on and off manually. More advanced cookers have computerized timing devices that let a cook program the cooker to perform multiple operations (e.g., two hours high, followed by two hours low, followed by warm) and to delay the start of cooking.

Because food cooked in a slow cooker stays warm for a long time after it is switched off, people can use the slow cookers to take food elsewhere to eat without reheating. Some slow cookers have lids that seal to prevent their contents from spilling during transport.

Recipes
Recipes intended for other cooking methods must be modified for slow cookers. Quantities of liquids may need adjustment, as there is a little evaporation, but there should be enough liquid to cover the food. Many published recipes for slow cookers are designed primarily for convenience and use few ingredients, and often use prepared sauces or seasonings. The long, moist cooking is particularly suitable for tough and cheap cuts of meat including pork shoulder, beef chuck and brisket. For many slow-cooked dishes, these cuts give better results than more expensive ones. They are also often used to cook while no one is there to care for it, meaning the cook can fill the pot with its ingredients and come back several hours later to a ready meal.

Advantages
Cheaper cuts of meat with connective tissue and lean muscle fibers are suitable for stewing, and produce tastier stews than those using expensive cuts, as long slow cooking softens connective tissue without toughening the muscle. Slow cooking leaves gelatinized tissue in the meat, so that it may be advantageous to start with a richer liquid.

The low temperature of slow-cooking makes it almost impossible to burn; even food that has been cooked too long. However, some meats and most vegetables become nearly tasteless or "raggy" if over-cooked.

Food can be set to slow-cook before leaving for the day so it is ready on return. Many homeowners with rooftop solar panels switch to slow cooking because it draws under 1 kW of power and can therefore be powered entirely by 1-2 kW panels during the day. Some models include timers or thermostats that bring food to a given temperature and then lower it. With a timerless cooker it is possible to use an external timer to stop cooking after a set time, or both to start and stop.

Cooking the meal in a single pot reduces water waste resulting from cleaning multiple dishes, and the low cooking temperature and glazed pot make cleaning easier than conventional high-heat pots.

Disadvantages
Some vitamins and other trace nutrients are lost, particularly from vegetables, partially by enzyme action during cooking and partially due to heat degradation. When vegetables are cooked at higher temperatures these enzymes are rapidly denatured and have less time to act during cooking. Since slow cookers work at temperatures well below boiling point and do not rapidly denature enzymes, vegetables tend to lose trace nutrients. Blanched vegetables, having been exposed to very hot water, have already had these enzymes rendered largely ineffective, so a blanching or sauteing pre-cook stage leaves more vitamins intact. This is often a smaller nutrient loss than over-boiling and can be lessened to an extent by not removing the lid until the food is done.

Slow cookers do not provide sufficient heat to compensate for loss of moisture and heat due to frequent removal of the lid, e.g., to add and remove food in perpetual stews, (pot-au-feu, olla podrida). Added ingredients must be given time to cook before the food can be eaten.

Hazards

Scalding
Slow cookers are less dangerous than ovens or stove tops due to their lower operating temperatures and closed lids. However, they still contain a large amount of foods and liquids at temperatures close to boiling, and they can cause serious scalds if spilled.

Poisoning concerns
Slow cookers should not be used to cook dried kidney beans and other legume seeds. These foods contain the highly toxic lectin phytohemagglutinin, making as few as four raw beans toxic. Information published by the United States Food and Drug Administration states that slow cookers should not be used to cook bean containing dishes. Commercially canned beans are fully cooked and are safe to use. Pressure cooking also deactivates the lectins.

See also

 Beanpot
 Carry over cooking
 Combi steamer
 Haybox
 List of cooking appliances
 Low-temperature cooking
 Rice cooker
 Remoska
 Sous-vide
 Thermal cooking

References

Further reading

 

Cooking appliances
Cooking vessels
Cooking techniques